The Melbourne Marathon has been held annually since 1978. The 42.195 km run over the traditional marathon distance is the main race within the annual Melbourne Marathon Festival. The race celebrated its 30th birthday in 2007 with a new course which featured the Melbourne Cricket Ground (MCG) as both the starting point and finishing point. A total of 3328 competitors completed the 2008 race. Another 17,000 people participated in Half Marathon (21.1 km), 10 km and 5.5 km events.

The 2019 running of the marathon saw an Australian record of 7037 finishers, 1880 of whom were female (27%). In 1978 approximately 4% of the 1947 finishers were female.

The 2020 event was cancelled on 9 September due to the COVID-19 crisis. A virtual marathon was run for the period 5 December to 13 December.

In September 2021 it was decided to postpone the 2021 event until the 11th and 12th of December. The marathon and half marathon were run on Sunday the 12th, starting an hour earlier to escape the heat. The shorter events were held on the afternoon of Saturday the 11th.

The 2022 event returned to October with all events being run on Sunday. There were 6215 finishers in the marathon

The marathon has been owned by IMG since 2006.

The course
A variety of different courses have been used for the Melbourne Marathon although the most common course has begun at Frankston and concluded at either Albert Park or at The Arts Centre on St. Kilda Rd. It is normally run on the second Sunday in October.

Since 2007 the event has started near the MCG and finished with a lap of the ground. The predominantly flat marathon course goes through some of the most scenic areas of Melbourne. It skirts the Botanic Gardens and Albert Park Lake with several kilometres on the road parallel to the beaches of Port Phillip Bay. The other events share parts of the course but staggered starts ease congestion.

Past winners
Key:

† = short course

Spartans

Qualification
Spartans are runners who have completed 10 or more Melbourne Marathons and are recognised today by their distinctive green, gold, red, maroon or navy running singlets. Every Spartan has their own personalised race number. The singlet is worn with pride by all Spartans as a sign of their dedication to marathon running and the Melbourne Marathon in particular. Club records reflect over 1400 males and 150 females who have qualified as Spartans. Most come from Victoria but there are many from other states with at least two from Japan.

Legends and Hall of Fame members

Spartan Legends are a select group of runners who have completed every Melbourne Marathon since the beginning. After the 44th running there were three remaining Spartan Legends. Runners who have completed at least 30 marathons are eligible for the Melbourne Marathon Hall of Fame. The runners marked with an asterisk in the following list completed the first 30 marathons.

Wheelchair Spartans 

The Melbourne Marathon has always included wheelchair entrants. Two have attained Spartan status: Dean Callow who has completed 12 and Ian Gainey who has now completed 30 races and was inducted into the Hall of Fame at the 2022 Annual General Meeting.

References

"The Wall: The history of the Melbourne Marathon 1978–2012" by Chris Muirden
List of winners
Melbourne Marathon. Association of Road Racing Statisticians (2013-10-15). Retrieved 2013-10-26.

External links 
 Melbourne Marathon Site
 Melbourne Marathon Facebook Group
 Melbourne Marathon Spartans Site
 Melbourne Marathon results 1978–2019
 2013 Melbourne Marathon TV Highlights

Marathons in Australia
Sports competitions in Melbourne
Recurring sporting events established in 1978
1978 establishments in Australia
Annual sporting events in Australia